A list of films produced by the Israeli film industry in 2004.

2004 releases

Awards

Notable deaths

 June 29 – Arik Lavie, Israeli singer and actor (b. 1927).

See also
2004 in Israel

References

External links
 Israeli films of 2004 at the Internet Movie Database

Israeli
Film
2004